Elections to Liverpool City Council were held on Thursday 1 November 1883. One third of the council seats were up for election, the term of office of each councillor being three years.

This was the first local election since the passing of the Corrupt and Illegal Practices Prevention Act 1883 which "criminalised attempts to bribe voters and standardised the amount that could be spent on election expenses" and introduced election agents.

Twelve of the sixteen seats were uncontested.

After the election, the composition of the council was:

Election result

Ward results

* - Retiring Councillor seeking re-election

Abercromby

Castle Street

Everton

Exchange

Great George

Lime Street

North Toxteth

Pitt Street

Rodney Street

St. Anne Street

St. Paul's

St. Peter's

Scotland

South Toxteth

Vauxhall

West Derby

Aldermanic Elections

At the meeting of the council on 9 November 1883, the terms of office of eight 
alderman expired.

The following eight were elected as Aldermen by the council (Aldermen and Councillors) on 9 November 1883 for a term of six years.

* - re-elected aldermen.

By-elections

No. 6, Castle Street, 13 November 1883

Caused by the resignation of Councillor Samuel Smith MP (Liberal, Castle Street, elected 1 November 1882) 

which was reported to the council on 5 December 1883.

No. 12, Lime Street, 23 November 1883

Caused by the election of Councillor Edward Grindley  (Conservative, Lime Street, 
elected 1 November 1881) as an aldermen by the council (councillors and aldermen) on 9 November 1883.

Aldermanic By-Election, 9 January 1884

Caused by the death of Alderman Andrew Boyd on 20 December 1883.

Subsequently, former Councillor David Radcliffe (Conservative, Rodney Street, elected 1 November 1880),  of Formby Hall Ainsdale, was elected as an alderman by the council (Councillors and Aldermen) on 9 January 1884.

No. 14, West Derby, 26 April 1884

Caused by the death of Councillor Samuel Leigh Gregson (Conservative, West Derby, 
elected 1 November 1882)
on 3 April 1884.

No. 9, Great George, 21 May 1884

Caused by the resignation of Councillor John Frederick Rogers (Party?, Great George, 
elected 1 November 1883).

No. 9, Great George, 2 September 1884

Caused by the death of Councillor Benjamin Lewis (Liberal, Great George, 
elected 1 November 1882)  on 12 August 1884.

See also

 Liverpool City Council
 Liverpool Town Council elections 1835 - 1879
 Liverpool City Council elections 1880–present
 Mayors and Lord Mayors of Liverpool 1207 to present
 History of local government in England

References

1883
1883 English local elections
1880s in Liverpool